Irina Mikhaylovna Fedotova ((born  15 February 1975 in Krasnodar) is a Russian rower who competed for the Russia in the three Summer Olympics.

In 2000, she was a crew member of the Russia boat which won the bronze medal in the quadruple sculls event.

External links
profile

1975 births
Living people
Sportspeople from Krasnodar
Russian female rowers
Olympic rowers of Russia
Rowers at the 1996 Summer Olympics
Rowers at the 2000 Summer Olympics
Rowers at the 2004 Summer Olympics
Olympic bronze medalists for Russia
Olympic medalists in rowing
Medalists at the 2000 Summer Olympics
World Rowing Championships medalists for Russia